Gustav "Guzzi" Lantschner (12 August 1910 – 19 March 2011) was an Austrian-born German alpine skier turned actor. He competed in the 1936 Winter Olympics. He was born in Innsbruck, Austria and was the younger brother of Hellmut Lantschner. Competing for Austria, he won the downhill world championship in 1932. At the 1936 Winter Olympics, he won the silver medal in the alpine skiing combined event.

External links
 
 Gustav Lantschner's profile at databaseolympics.com
 Gustav Lantschner's profile at Internet Movie Database
 

1910 births
2011 deaths
Alpine skiers at the 1936 Winter Olympics
Austrian male alpine skiers
Austrian centenarians
German male alpine skiers
Olympic alpine skiers of Germany
Olympic silver medalists for Germany
Olympic medalists in alpine skiing
Sportspeople from Innsbruck
Medalists at the 1936 Winter Olympics
Men centenarians